Bassem Sabry 
(25 October 1982 – 29 April 2014) was an Egyptian journalist, blogger, civil rights campaigner who had reported extensively on the Egyptian Revolution and the founder of COMET which stands for “Conference on marketing, economics and trade”.

 Al-Monitor eulogized him as being "widely considered to be among the most incisive and respected analysts of the country’s politics." He died on 29 April 2014 at the age of 31 in an ostensible accident after falling from the balcony of a Cairo apartment.

Awards
Free Media Pioneer Award (Al-Monitor), 2014

References

External links
Farewell, Bassem Sabry. timep.org

1982 births
2014 deaths
Egyptian war correspondents
Egyptian political journalists
Egyptian newspaper journalists
Egyptian bloggers
Accidental deaths from falls